Thameslink is a 24-hour main-line route in the British railway system, running from , , ,  and  via central London to Sutton, Rainham, and . The network opened as a through service in 1988, with severe overcrowding by 1998, carrying more than 28,000 passengers in the morning peak. All the services are currently operated by Govia Thameslink Railway.

The Thameslink Programme was a major £5.5billion scheme to increase capacity on the central London section by accommodating more frequent and longer trains, and providing additional routes and destinations. The new services began operating in 2018. In 2016, new Class 700 trains started operating on the route and replaced the Class 319, Class 377 and Class 387 trains which were withdrawn and transferred elsewhere.

Route
Much of the original route is over the Brighton Main Line (via London Bridge) and the southern part of the Midland Main Line, plus a suburban true loop (circuit) serving Sutton. A branch via the Catford Loop Line to Sevenoaks was added in 2012. Sections to Peterborough on the East Coast Main Line, Cambridge via the Cambridge Line, Horsham on the Arun Valley line and Rainham via Greenwich were added in 2018. East Grinstead and Littlehampton are also served in peak hours.

The route through central London (today known as Thameslink core) is via St Pancras International for connections to Eurostar and the East Midlands; Farringdon, for London Underground Circle, Metropolitan and Hammersmith & City lines, and the Elizabeth line; City Thameslink, which replaced the demolished Holborn Viaduct station and has a southern entrance serving Ludgate Circus; Blackfriars, for main-line rail services and the Underground District and Circle lines; and London Bridge for main-line links into Kent and Sussex and the Underground Northern and Jubilee lines. King's Cross Thameslink on Pentonville Road closed on 8 December 2007.

Trains operating the "main line" service (Bedford and Cambridge to Brighton, Peterborough to Horsham) include first-class accommodation; those operating from Luton, St Albans and Kentish Town to Sutton, Sevenoaks and Orpington are usually standard class only. When Govia operated the original Thameslink franchise these services were designated "Thameslink CityFlier" and "Thameslink CityMetro" respectively, but First Capital Connect dropped this branding. Govia Thameslink Railway now refers to these services as Route TL1 (formerly Route 6) and Route TL2/TL3 (formerly Route 7/8) respectively.

Services

Off-peak 

The published Thameslink off-peak service pattern as of December 2022, with frequencies in trains per hour (tph), includes:

Peak hours 

During peak hours, the one train per hour Letchworth Garden City to London King's Cross service (from the table above) is extended to/from Cambridge, with extra calls at Baldock, Ashwell & Morden, Royston, Meldreth, Shepreth and Foxton, thereby creating a two trains per hour Cambridge to London King's Cross (and return) stopping service during these hours only.

Also during peak hours, the two trains per hour London Blackfriars to Sevenoaks service (from the table above) is extended through the 'core tunnel' to/from Welwyn Garden City (though a few services originate at Finsbury Park), with extra calls at City Thameslink, Farringdon, St Pancras International, Finsbury Park, New Southgate, Oakleigh Park, New Barnet, Potters Bar and Hatfield.

As well as these services, during peak hours, several trains in each direction (approximately two trains per hour) run to/from Orpington (originating/terminating at either London Blackfriars, Luton, West Hampstead Thameslink or Kentish Town), all calling at Petts Wood in lieu of stations from St Mary Cray to Bat & Ball.

History

Passenger services operated across London through the Snow Hill Tunnel from mid-Victorian times until World War I, when services terminated at Moorgate from the Midland line to the north, and at Holborn Viaduct from the south, at a time when most inner cross-London traffic had been lost to buses and trams. There were low-level platforms under the main part of Holborn Viaduct station known as the Snow Hill platforms: these can still be seen when leaving City Thameslink station travelling northwards.

On 14 June 1941, railway manager George Dow proposed in an article in the London evening newspaper The Star that new routes be built in tunnels from Marylebone south to Victoria, and from King's Cross south to Charing Cross.  Both were to connect with a Paddington–Liverpool Street tunnel that he proposed, anticipating Crossrail by 40years. He also proposed a north-east to south-west such link (Liverpool Street to Charing Cross), all giving seamless, key, main-line connections.

The Snow Hill Tunnel route remained open for cross-London freight trains until 1970, when the short section between Farringdon and Holborn Viaduct was closed.

Overhead electrification, completed in 1982, allowed the northern section to run as the Midland City Line from Bedford via the Midland Main Line to St Pancras, and via the City Widened Lines to Moorgate.

The Snow Hill tunnel was re-opened by British Rail to passenger trains after 72years, with Thameslink beginning in May 1988. On 29 January 1990, the section between Blackfriars and Farringdon was temporarily closed to permit the construction of a new alignment. The route through the site of the long-closed Ludgate Hill station, over Ludgate Hill to Holborn Viaduct was abandoned and demolished.

King's Cross Thameslink on Pentonville Road closed on 8 December 2007, when the Thameslink platforms at nearby St Pancras opened.

In the south the services divide: many main-line trains run almost due south through London Bridge to East Croydon and many continue to Brighton, but the other route/branch has evolved, as follows:
From 1988 to 1991 such trains went variously
via Bromley: to Orpington or to Sevenoaks, (both since resumed) or; 
via Herne Hill and East Croydon to Purley (off peak only). 
From 1991 to 1994, such trains went only via Elephant & Castle and Streatham to West Croydon, Carshalton Beeches, Sutton, Epsom, Leatherhead and Effingham Junction, to Guildford.
From 1994 to 1995 such trains terminated at West Croydon (cutting franchise zone-crossing due to rail privatisation).
From the latter year such trains have run "to/from" a nominal furthest point of a true circular loop, Sutton, the Sutton loop calling at stations including Mitcham Junction, Streatham and Wimbledon.
From 2018 the service was greatly recast and expanded following the completion of the Thameslink programme:
A regular service to Rainham has been added.
A regular service to Horsham has been added.
In the north the present termini of the trains are Luton, Bedford, Cambridge, Peterborough, St Albans and in peak hours, Welwyn Garden City.

Franchise owners
As of the early 1990s privatisation of British Rail, Thameslink was franchised to Thameslink, a subsidiary of Govia.

By late 1998, more than 28,000 passengers were carried at morning peak times.

From 1 April 2006, the franchise was taken over by First Capital Connect along with some services that had been WAGN's. The branding of most trains, stations, and signs was changed to match the name of the new company, but City Thameslink and West Hampstead Thameslink were not renamed as Thameslink referred to the route. After criticism of the loss of the apt name for this group of routes, First Capital Connect's publicity began calling this set of services its "Thameslink route" to distinguish it from the former WAGN services.

On 14 September 2014, Govia Thameslink Railway took over operations from First Capital Connect.

Thameslink Programme

Given the network's success, realised plans arose to upgrade the network to cope with persistent peak-time overcrowding. Network Rail obtained planning permission and legal powers in 2006, funding was secured in July 2007 and construction began in October 2007. Plans included rebuilding the station buildings at Farringdon (in conjunction with the Crossrail project) and West Hampstead Thameslink, total rebuild of London Bridge and Blackfriars stations, two new underground platforms at St Pancras International, a new tunnel north of St Pancras International to the East Coast Main Line to allow through services to Peterborough and Cambridge, and platform lengthening. A new 8- and 12-carriage fleet of Class 700 trains began in 2016. The new services on to the Great Northern route began initially on 8 March 2018, with the full timetable being introduced in May 2018.

The London and South East Route Utilisation Strategy published in July 2011 laid out a provisional 24 timetable. South of London it would provide four trains to Brighton (one semi-fast, one stopping) and two each to Three Bridges, Horsham, East Grinstead, Caterham, Tattenham Corner, Tunbridge Wells, Ashford International, Maidstone East, Sevenoaks and Bellingham. North of London there would be eight semi-fast trains to Bedford, four stopping trains to St Albans, two stopping and two semi-fast trains to Luton, two semi-fast trains to Peterborough, two semi-fast trains to Cambridge and four stopping trains to Welwyn Garden City.

Below is a provisional timetable solely for services running through the 'Thameslink core' tunnel. This 'provisional timetable' was proposed before the upgrade and has not yet been achieved. See Services section above for the current service pattern.

Rolling stock

Current fleet

Class 700 
New Class 700 trains provide an additional 14,500 seats and were delivered between 2015 and 2018. Siemens Mobility was named preferred bidder on 16 June 2011, with the Desiro City train family. The contract was signed in June 2013 for 1,140 carriages, with 55 twelve-car and 60 eight-car trains.  The depots are at Hornsey and Three Bridges. The Three Bridges depot opened in October 2015 and the first trains entered service in spring 2016. All units are now in service, having replaced the Class 319 and Class 387 fleets.

Past fleet

Class 319 
Rolling stock used on Thameslink included the 86 Class 319 trains built between 1987–1988 and 1990. These are electrically powered dual-voltage four-car units rated to carry 289, 308 or 319 passengers. Four Class 319 trains had been transferred from Southern in December 2008 and the last four followed in March 2009, from which point they were all on Thameslink. The last was withdrawn in August 2017.

Class 377 
First Capital Connect acquired 23 four-coach Class 377 sets during 2009 on sublease from Southern, for the Thameslink route for additional capacity and to allow some of the Class 319 trains to be released for the Catford Loop service to Sevenoaks, now jointly operated with Southeastern under Key Output 0 of the Thameslink Programme.

Class 317 
Class 317 units built in the early 1980s were still in use when services into Moorgate ceased in March 2009: the last timetabled service ran from Farringdon to Bedford on 9 October 2009.

Class 387 
Due to delays in the new Class 700 fleet, the DfT and Southern ordered 116 electric dual-voltage  carriages (29 trains) with the option for another 140 carriages (35 trains). The tender for the new  trains was won by Bombardier and the first set entered service in December 2014, with all in service by May 2015. By 2018, all units were replaced by the new Class 700 fleet with the Class 387 fleet moving over to the Great Northern brand.

Electrical power 
All rolling stock used on Thameslink is electrically powered dual-voltage units using  overhead power north of Farringdon and 750VDC third rail to the south.

2014 franchise
The invitation to tender for the Thameslink, Southern and Great Northern franchise was expected to be issued in October 2012, with the contract commencing in September 2013. On 29 March 2012, the Department for Transport announced Abellio, FirstGroup, Govia, MTR Corporation and Stagecoach Group had pre-qualified to bid for the franchise.

Due to problems with the InterCity West Coast tendering process, the process was delayed, with the new franchise delayed until September 2014. The new franchise includes the South Central franchise currently operated by Southern and certain routes from the Integrated Kent Franchise currently operated by Southeastern.

On 23 May 2014, it was announced that the franchise has been awarded to Govia Thameslink Railway. The new Thameslink Southern & Great Northern franchise will include both the Thameslink Great Northern and South Central franchises.

Govia Thameslink Railway began operations on 14 September 2014, with the former First Capital Connect routes Thameslink and Great Northern.

Thameslink 2
Railfuture, an organisation campaigning for better rail services for passengers and freight, has proposed an additional north–south route, connecting the Brighton Main Line to routes north of London, via East Croydon, Lewisham, Canary Wharf, and Stratford.

See also
Crossrail – project to build the east–west Elizabeth line route through London
West London Line – the North West-South route across London
Réseau Express Régional (RER) – the similar cross city rail network in Paris
Cross-City Line – a similar north–south route across Birmingham
Rail transport in Great Britain

Notes

References

Further reading

External links

 
Airport rail links in London
Transport in the London Borough of Barnet
Rail transport in Bedfordshire
Transport in Brighton and Hove
Transport in the London Borough of Camden
Transport in the City of London
Transport in the London Borough of Croydon
Rail transport in East Sussex
Rail transport in Hertfordshire
Transport in the London Borough of Islington
Transport in the London Borough of Lambeth
Transport in the London Borough of Merton
Transport in the London Borough of Southwark
Rail transport in Surrey
Transport in the London Borough of Sutton
Rail transport in West Sussex
Transport in Luton/Dunstable Urban Area
Transport in Bedford